Khash (also Romanized as Khāsh, Kavash, and Kwāsh; also known as Vāsht) is a city in and the capital of Khash County, in Sistan and Baluchestan province, Iran. At the 2006 census, its population was 56,683, in 10,176 families.

The overwhelming majority of the city's inhabitants are ethnic Baloch who speak the Balochi language, and Persians who speak a variant of the Persian language known as Sistani or Seistani which is very similar to Dari, also known as Afghan Persian. It is located at an altitude of 1400 metres (4596 feet).

On April 16, 2013, an earthquake of magnitude 7.8 struck the Iran-Pakistan border near Balochistan. The epicenter of the earthquake was at Khash.

On 4 November 2022, security forces fired on protestors in Khash, with about 30 people killed or injured. An entire commercial district was set on fire during the unrest.

Khash also is the point of origin for the abnormally high incidence of Factor XIII deficiency, an extremely serious genetic bleeding disorder in Iran; it is more than 100 times more prevalent in Iran than anywhere else due to the high degree of consanguineous marriage.

References

Populated places in Khash County
Cities in Sistan and Baluchestan Province